The murder of Jared Plesec was the murder of 21-year-old Salvation Army worker Jared Plesec in Lakewood, Ohio. Plesec was a Bible study teacher at the Salvation Army. He was holding a copy of the Bible when he was shot in the head by 27-year old William Jones.

Crime spree

Jared Plesec was 21 year old at the time he was fatally shot by William Jones in the lobby of his apartment complex. Plesec was recognized by community members for his devout faith and outreach work in the community. He worked with young people, encouraging them to attend church.

Jones made several statements after killing Plesec, screaming in the building lobby "Fuck Trump", "A life for a life" and "I did it fo y'all, man." These 4 minutes were filmed by a building resident and broadcast to Facebook Live.

After the murder of Plesec, Jones went on a crime spree in Cleveland, Ohio lasting 63 minutes.

Trial
Jones prepared and made an allocution statement before sentencing. He made a one-sentence apology to the family members of Jarded Plesec. He then invoked the names of Trayvon Martin (killed by George Zimmerman), Tamir Rice, and the shooting of Timothy Russell and Malissa Williams (killed by Cleveland police). Plesec's family members groaned as Jones read the statement.

He said "It just seems, when a white life takes a black life, it's justified. Today you seek justice. I can't help but wonder if the shoe was on the other foot, would it be justified instead?" He also invoked the slogan "Black Lives Matter". 

He finished the allocution statement by asking "Do black lives really matter, or are just not as important as others?" The sentencing judge replied only that "All lives matter" and added that the "attempt to try to justify the taking of Jared's life is really incomprehensible".

Jones was sentenced to life without parole at the conclusion of his trial in 2018.

Perpetrator

At the time of the murder, Jones was on a released supervision from prison after serving nearly two years for a previous armed carjacking.

Legacy
In 2019 a lawsuit was filed against the management of the apartment complex where Plesec was shot. An attorney for the plaintiffs issued a statement that the Euclid Beach Villa Apartments where the crime took place had a record of "vicious assaults and other crimes". The plaintiffs say the buildings should have had more security.

New York Times journalist Alex Berenson argued in his new book that cannabis-dependent patients with psychosis were "four times as likely to be violent". The murder of Jared Plesec and the crime spree that followed in December 2017 is one of several crimes Berenson cites in the book where the perpetrator had been under the influence of marijuana. No other drugs were found in Jones' system.

External links
Video of Jones "rage statement" broadcast on Facebook Live after the murder
Video of Jones statement at the sentencing hearing

References

2017 murders in the United States
Category:Racially motivated violence against European Americans